Josef Erleback was a Czechoslovakian Nordic skier who competed in cross-country skiing in the 1920s; he won a bronze medal in the 18 km event at the 1925 FIS Nordic World Ski Championships.

References

External links

Czech male cross-country skiers
FIS Nordic World Ski Championships medalists in cross-country skiing
Year of birth missing
Year of death missing